Grevillea occidentalis is a species of flowering plant in the family Proteaceae and is endemic to the south of Western Australia. It is a spreading to erect shrub with linear to narrowly egg-shaped or narrowly elliptic leaves and grey or off-white flowers.

Description

TaxonomyGrevillea occidentalis was first formally described in 1810 by Robert Brown in Transactions of the Linnean Society of London. The specific epithet (occidentalis'') means "western".

Distribution and habitat
This grevillea grows in heath and woodland between Kojonup, Walpole and Albany in the Avon Wheatbelt, Esperance Plains, Jarrah Forest and Warren bioregions of southern Western Australia.

See also
 List of Grevillea species

References

occidentalis
Endemic flora of Western Australia
Eudicots of Western Australia
Proteales of Australia
Taxa named by Robert Brown (botanist, born 1773)
Plants described in 1810